Jennifer White may refer to:

Actresses
Jennifer White Shah, or Jenny White, British actress and businesswoman

Sports
Jennifer White (basketball), American university basketball coach
Jenny White (racing driver) in 2009 ASA Midwest Tour season
Jennifer White (athlete) in 1979 IAAF World Cross Country Championships

Others
Jenny White (academic), see Turkish Studies Association
Jenn White, host of radio program 1A
Jennifer White (politician), American politician
Jennifer Whyte, English civil engineering academic